Eupolybothrus  fasciatus  is a species of centipedes in the family Lithobiidae.

Description
Antennae have 36 to 42 articles.

Distribution
Eupolybothrus fasciatus is an endemic species to Apennines (Italy).

References

 Celina Bedinia THE ULTRASTRUCTURE OF THE EYE OF A CENTIPEDE POLYBOTHRUS FASCIATUS (NEWPORT)
 C. Attems, 1929 Die Myriopodenfauna von Albanien und Jugoslavien, Zoologische Jahrbücher, Abteilung für Systematik 56, pp. 296-356: 305

Lithobiomorpha
Endemic fauna of Italy
Animals described in 1845